Postplatyptilia saeva is a moth of the family Pterophoridae. It is known from Ecuador, Peru and Venezuela.

The wingspan is 16–18 mm. Adults are on wing in January, February, April, July and October.

References

saeva
Moths described in 1930